Ultimate Diamond is the seventh studio album released by Japanese voice actress and pop singer Nana Mizuki on June 3, 2009. It was released in two editions: a CD only edition and a limited CD+DVD edition.

The first press of the album has a 44-page booklet. A limited CD+DVD edition of the album included a DVD of a concert at the Shinjuku Koma Theater on October 11, 2008. At the concert, she covered two enka songs: Fuyumi Sakamoto's "Yozakura Oshichi" and Mitsuko Nakamura's "Kawachi Otoko Bushi". The limited DVD included the two songs.

The album reached number 1 in Japan's Oricon weekly albums charts for the week of June 15, 2009, and became the first album from a voice actress to accomplish that feat since the creation of Oricon.

Track listing
Maria & Joker
Lyrics: Hibiki
Composition, arrangement: Noriyasu Agematsu (Elements Garden)

Lyrics: Nana Mizuki
Composition, arrangement: Shogo Ohnishi
Perfect Smile
Lyrics, composition, arrangement: Hiroyuki Ito
Trickster
Lyrics: Nana Mizuki
Composition, arrangement: Noriyasu Agematsu (Elements Garden)
Mr.Bunny!
Lyrics: Sayuri
Composition: Mitsuru Wakabayashi
Arrangement: Shinya Saitou

Lyrics, composition: Shihori
Arrangement: Renka Amou
Brand New Tops
Lyrics: Yūmao
Composition, arrangement: Tomoya Miyabi

Lyrics, composition: Toshirou Yabuki
Arrangement: Toshirou Yabuki, Tsutomu Ouhira
Gimmick Game
Lyrics: Hibiki
Composition, arrangement: Junpei Fujita (Elements Garden)
Dancing in the Velvet Moon
Lyrics: Nana Mizuki
Composition: Noriyasu Agematsu (Elements Garden)
Arrangement: Noriyasu Agematsu, Masato Nakayama (Elements Garden)
Ray of change
Lyrics, composition: Kazunori Saita
Arrangement: Kouichiro Takahashi

Lyrics: Nana Mizuki
Composition: Noriyasu Agematsu (Elements Garden)
Arrangement: Hitoshi Fujima (Elements Garden)

Lyrics: Junko Tsuji
Composition: Shunsuke Matsui
Arrangement: Hitoshi Fujima (Elements Garden)
Astrogation
Lyrics: Hibiki
Composition, arrangement: Jun Suyama

Lyrics, composition: Nana Mizuki
Arrangement: Junpei Fujita (Elements Garden)

Charts

References

External links
 Information on official website

2009 albums
Nana Mizuki albums